Cenderawasih Pos (The Cenderawasih Post) is a daily newspaper published in Jayapura, Indonesia. The paper is the major paper of Jayapura and Papua province. It is owned by Jawa Pos Group and become a part of Jawa Pos News Network (JPNN).

Cenderawasih Pos was first published as SKM Cenderawasih on 28 October 1962; "SKM" itself means Surat Kabar Mingguan (weekly newspaper), indicating its periodical type. On 1 March 1993, Jawa Pos Group bought the paper, slightly changed its name and turned the paper into a daily publication. Since 2018, Cenderawasih Pos began its online presence.

References

Newspapers published in Indonesia
Mass media in Jayapura
1962 establishments in Indonesia
Publications established in 1962